Pindi Said Pur is a village and union council of Jhelum District in the Punjab Province of Pakistan. It is part of Pind Dadan Khan Tehsil. Constituencie of Union Counsel includes Saghar Pur, Peerawnwal, Bhabawnwala, Khewianwala, Syedawnwala.
Renowned casts of village are Arain, Bhattis,Jandrans, Awan, Khokhar, Pathan, Syed,  Jats, Muslim Shaikhs, Rajputs, Muhajirs, Kumhar, Mochi, Nai & Sonar's etc.
Major sources of income of its inhabitants are Agriculture and Services. popular games are Cricket, Kabaddi and tent pegging. Bull race, Dog fight and hunting are popular events of the area.     It is located at 32°40'0N 73°20'0E with an altitude of 215 metres (708 feet). Islam is the only religion in the town.

Geography 

Pindi Saidpur is located just on the edge of Indus plain near Salt range mountains. It is a plain area. The town is located about 3 km south of Salt range and 4.3 km north of Jhelum river. It is approximately 52 km west of Jhelum city and 27 km east of Pind Dadan Khan.It is located 37 km west of Khewra Salt Mine which is second largest salt mine in the world. This village is part of district Jhelum

Politics 
The chairman of the UC is Aslam Marath (Late) while Malik Qasim Rehan is the vice chairman, both of whom belong to PTI.

Education 
The two main and public schools in the town are:

 Government Boys High School Pindi Said Pur 
 Government Girls High School Pindi Said Pur

The private institutions includes:

 Allied Higher Secondary School (Iqbal Campus)
 The Educators
 The Learner
 Dar e Arqam
 The Pakistan School Of Ethics
 Unique Technical And Computer College

Neighbouring Villages 

 Saghar Pur (To the south)
 Sherpur (Towards South-West)
 Thill (Towards North-West)
 Chakri (Towards North-East)
 Mirza Abad (Towards East) 
 Awanpur (Towards North)
 Piranwala (Towards East - South)

References 

Populated places in Tehsil Pind Dadan Khan
Union councils of Pind Dadan Khan Tehsil